Decomposition method is a generic term for solutions of various problems and design of algorithms in which the basic idea is to decompose the problem into subproblems. The term may specifically refer to one of the following.

Decomposition method (constraint satisfaction) in constraint satisfaction
Decomposition method in multidisciplinary design optimization
Adomian decomposition method, a non-numerical method for solving nonlinear differential equations
Domain decomposition methods in mathematics, numerical analysis, and numerical partial differential equations
Cholesky decomposition method
Decomposition method in queueing network analysis